George Gordon King (June 9, 1807 – July 17, 1870) was a U.S. Representative from Rhode Island.

Early life
King was born in Newport, Rhode Island, on June 9, 1807. He was the eldest son of Dr. David King Sr. (1774–1836), and his wife, whose maiden name was Gordon. His three younger brothers were David King Jr., Edward King, and William Henry King (who owned Kingscote mansion in Newport), who each made large fortunes as traders by going to China with Russell & Company.  His nephew and namesake, George Gordon King, was married to Annie McKenzie Coats, the daughter of Sir James Coats, 1st Bt. and Sarah Ann (née Auchincloss) Coats.

King pursued classical studies in Newport and at Phillips Academy in Andover, Massachusetts.  He graduated from Brown University in 1825.  He attended the Litchfield Law School in Connecticut.

Career
He was admitted to the bar in 1827 and practiced in Providence and Newport.

He served as member and speaker of the State house of representatives in 1845 and 1846.  King was elected as a Whig to the Thirty-first and Thirty-second Congresses from March 4, 1849, until March 3, 1853, as he was an unsuccessful candidate for reelection.

Personal life
King died in Newport, Rhode Island, on July 17, 1870.  He was interred in Island Cemetery.

References

External links

King Family Papers, 1844-1901 at the William L. Clements Library, University of Michigan.

1807 births
1870 deaths
Politicians from Newport, Rhode Island
Members of the United States House of Representatives from Rhode Island
Brown University alumni
Rhode Island Whigs
Whig Party members of the United States House of Representatives
Speakers of the Rhode Island House of Representatives
19th-century American politicians